Amin Khatibi (born June 15, 1997 in Tabriz, Iran) is an Iranian footballer who currently plays for Gostaresh Foolad in the Iran Pro League.

References

 Amin Khatibi at Iran Pro League Website

1997 births
Living people
Sportspeople from Tabriz
Iranian footballers
Gostaresh Foulad F.C. players
Association football midfielders